Schoerner is a surname. Notable people with the surname include:

 Norbert Schoerner (born 1966), German photographer and filmmaker

See also
 Ferdinand Schörner (1892–1973), German military commander
 Schörner